This is a list of Spanish football transfers for the summer sale in the 2015–16 season of La Liga and Segunda División. Only moves from La Liga and Segunda División are listed.

The summer transfer window began on 1 July 2015, although a few transfers took place prior to that date. The window closed at midnight on 1 September 2015. Players without a club can join one at any time, either during or in between transfer windows. Clubs below La Liga level can also sign players on loan at any time. If needed, clubs can sign a goalkeeper on an emergency loan, if all others are unavailable.

La Liga

Athletic Bilbao 
Manager:  Ernesto Valverde (3rd season)

In:

Out:

Atlético Madrid 
Manager:  Diego Simeone (5th season)

In:

Out:

Barcelona 
Manager:  Luis Enrique Martínez (2nd season)

In:

Out:

Betis 
Manager:  Pepe Mel (2nd season)

In:

Out:

Celta Vigo 
Manager:  Eduardo Berizzo (2nd season)

In:

Out:

Deportivo La Coruña 
Manager:  Víctor Sánchez (2nd season)

In:

Out:

Eibar 
Manager:  José Luis Mendilibar (1st season)

In:

Out:

Espanyol 
Manager:  Sergio González (2nd season)

In:

Out:

Getafe 
Manager:  Fran Escribá (1st season)

In:

Out:

Granada 
Manager:  José Ramón Sandoval (2nd season)

In:

Out:

Las Palmas 
Manager:  Paco Herrera (2nd season)

In:

Out:

Levante 
Manager:  Lucas Alcaraz (2nd season)

In:

Out:

Málaga 
Manager:  Javi Gracia (2nd season)

In:

Out:

Rayo Vallecano 
Manager:  Paco Jémez (4th season)

In:

Out:

Real Madrid 
Manager:  Rafael Benítez (1st season)

In:

Out:

Real Sociedad 
Manager:  David Moyes (2nd season)

In:

Out:

Sevilla 
Manager:  Unai Emery (3rd season)

In:

Out:

Sporting Gijón 
Manager:  Abelardo Fernández (3rd season)

In:

Out:

Valencia 
Manager:  Nuno Espírito Santo (2nd season)

In:

Out:

Villarreal 
Manager:  Marcelino García Toral (3rd season)

In:

Out:

Segunda División

Alavés 
Manager:  José Bordalás (1st season)

In:

Out:

Albacete 
Manager:  Luis César Sampedro (4th season)

In:

Out:

Alcorcón 
Manager:  Juan Ramón López Muñiz (1st season)

In:

Out:

Almería 
Manager:  Sergi Barjuan (2nd season)

In:

Out:

Bilbao Athletic 
Manager:  José Ángel Ziganda (5th season)

In:

Out:

Córdoba 
Manager:  José Luis Oltra (1st season)

In:

Out:

Elche 
Manager:  Rubén Baraja (1st season)

In:

Out:

Gimnàstic 
Manager:  Vicente Moreno (3rd season)

In:

Out:

Girona 
Manager:  Pablo Machín (2nd season)

In:

Out:

Huesca 
Manager:  Luis Tevenet (2nd season)

In:

Out:

Leganés 
Manager:  Asier Garitano (3rd season)

In:

Out:

Llagostera 
Manager:  Lluís Carrillo (2nd season)

In:

Out:

Lugo 
Manager:  Luis Milla (1st season)

In:

Out:

Mallorca 
Manager:  Albert Ferrer (1st season)

In:

Out:

Mirandés 
Manager:  Carlos Terrazas (3rd season)

In:

Out:

Numancia 
Manager:  Jagoba Arrasate (1st season)

In:

Out:

Osasuna 
Manager:  Enrique Martín Monreal (2nd season)

In:

Out:

Oviedo 
Manager:  Sergio Egea (2nd season)

In:

Out:

Ponferradina 
Manager:  José Manuel Díaz (2nd season)

In:

Out:

Tenerife 
Manager:  Raül Agné (2nd season)

In:

Out:

Valladolid 
Manager:  Gaizka Garitano (1st season)

In:

Out:

Zaragoza 
Manager:  Ranko Popović (2nd season)

In:

Out:

References

Transfers
Spain
2015